Luis d'Antin van Rooten (November 29, 1906 – June 17, 1973) was a Mexican-born American actor. He was sometimes credited as Louis Van Rooten.

Van Rooten was born in Mexico City, Mexico, and emigrated to the United States with his parents when he was eight, growing up in Pennsylvania. He earned his BA at the University of Pennsylvania and worked as an architect before deciding to pursue film work in Hollywood during World War II. His facility with languages made van Rooten an in-demand military radio announcer during the war, and he conducted a variety of broadcasts in Italian, Spanish, and French. This led into film work, often in roles requiring an accent or skill with dialects.

Film work
Known for his villainous roles, he played Nazi ringleader Heinrich Himmler in The Hitler Gang (1944) and Operation Eichmann (1961). He played supporting roles with a number of film stars, including Alan Ladd in Two Years Before the Mast (1946) and Beyond Glory (1948), Charles Laughton in The Big Clock (1948), Veronica Lake in Saigon (1948), Edward G. Robinson in Night Has a Thousand Eyes (1948), and Kirk Douglas in Detective Story (1951). He provided the voices for both the King and the Grand Duke in Walt Disney's animated film Cinderella (1950).

Radio, Broadway and television
Van Rooten found steady work doing narration in addition to acting in live television and radio dramas, such as The Affairs of Peter Salem, The Mysterious Traveler and I Love a Mystery, particularly as "The Maestro" in the 1949 story "Bury Your Dead, Arizona" and as ranch foreman "Jasper" in the 1950 story "The Battle of the Century". He portrayed the evil Roxor in the late 1940s revival of the radio serial Chandu the Magician and portrayed the title character's sidekick, Denny, in Bulldog Drummond. Van Rooten played Emilio in the radio soap opera Valiant Lady. He also performed on Broadway in Eugene O'Neill's A Touch of the Poet (1958) and John Osborne's Luther (1963). In 1958 he guest-starred as murderer Samuel D. Carlin in the Perry Mason episode, "The Case of the One-Eyed Witness". Van Rooten also appeared in an uncredited role on The Honeymooners as Mr. Johnson, the landlord. In 1952, he played the fictional French detective Maigret in an episode of the anthology series Suspense.

Books
He is best known for his character work in films, but van Rooten was also a skilled artist and designer and the author of several sophisticated books of humor. These include Van Rooten's Book of Improbable Saints and The Floriculturist's Vade Mecum of Exotic and Recondite Plants, Shrubs and Grasses, and One Malignant Parasite 

Van Rooten died June 17, 1973, in Chatham, Massachusetts, where he and his family had a vacation home.

Mots D'Heures: Gousses, Rames

Van Rooten is well known in particular for his book Mots D'Heures: Gousses, Rames (1967), ostensibly a collection of poems by an obscure and unsung Frenchman (with translations and commentary). Van Rooten used French words and phrases which, when spoken aloud with a French accent, produce English Mother Goose rhymes, a work of homophonic translation. The following example, when spoken aloud, sounds like the opening lines to "Humpty Dumpty":

A free translation might read:

Filmography

References

External links
 
 

1906 births
1973 deaths
20th-century American male actors
American male film actors
American male voice actors
Male actors from Mexico City
Male actors from Pennsylvania
Mexican emigrants to the United States
Mexican people of Dutch descent
Mexican people of French descent
Mexican people of Italian descent
University of Pennsylvania alumni